Sweet Sugar may refer to:

 Sweet Sugar, nickname of Bradley Pryce
 Sweet Sugar (film), 1972 women in prison film, starring Phyllis Davis and Ella Edwards
 "Sweet Sugar", 1980 song from The Sky's the Limit (The Dynamic Superiors album)
 "Sweet Sugar", 1995 song by Uriah Heep from Sea of Light (album)
 "Sweet Sugar", 2008 song by One Night Only from album Started a Fire

See also 

 Sweet (disambiguation)
 Sugar (disambiguation)
 Brown Sugar (disambiguation)
 Sweet Brown Sugar (disambiguation)
 Sugar Is Not Sweet, Thai film